Ntuthuko Madela (born 23 June 1997) is a South African soccer player who plays as a defender for Polokwane City.

References

Living people
1997 births
South African soccer players
Association football defenders
AmaZulu F.C. players
Jomo Cosmos F.C. players

Polokwane City F.C. players
South African Premier Division players
National First Division players